James Leo Herlihy (February 27, 1927 – October 21, 1993) was an American novelist, playwright and actor.

Herlihy is known for his novels Midnight Cowboy and All Fall Down, and his play Blue Denim, all of which were adapted for cinema. Other publications include The Season of the Witch and several short stories.

Biography
Herlihy was born into a working-class family in Detroit, Michigan, in 1927. He was raised in Detroit and Chillicothe, Ohio.  He enlisted with the Navy in 1945 but saw no action due to the end of World War II. He attended Black Mountain College in North Carolina for two years, where he studied sculpture. He then moved to southern California and attended the Pasadena Playhouse College of the Theatre.

A gay man, Herlihy was a close friend of playwright Tennessee Williams, who served as his mentor. Both spent a significant amount of time in Key West, Florida. Like Williams, Herlihy had lived in New York City. Apart from Key West, the primary home of Herlihy was in the Silver Lake district of Los Angeles. There, another mentor and close friend was author Anais Nin who shared some of her most secret diaries with him. 

Herlihy committed suicide at the age of 66, by taking an overdose of sleeping pills in Los Angeles.

Works
Plays he wrote include Streetlight Sonata (1950), Moon in Capricorn (1953), and Blue Denim (produced on Broadway in 1958).
He directed actress Tallulah Bankhead in a touring production of his play Crazy October in 1959.
Three of his one-act plays, titled collectively Stop, You're Killing Me were presented by the Theater Company of Boston in 1969.
According to author Sean Egan in his biography of James Kirkwood Jr., Ponies & Rainbows, Herlihy co-wrote the play UTBU with Kirkwood but demanded his name be taken off the credits.

Herlihy wrote three novels: All Fall Down (1960), Midnight Cowboy (1965), and The Season of the Witch (1971).
His short stories were collected in The Sleep of Baby Filbertson and Other Stories (1959) and A Story That Ends in a Scream and Eight Others (1967), a collection which included plays.

Acting roles
Herlihy appeared as a guest star in "A Bunch of Lonely Pagliaccis," a 1962 episode of the TV series Route 66.  He acted in the movie In the French Style (1963) with Jean Seberg.  Herlihy also acted in Edward Albee's play The Zoo Story in 1963 in Boston and Paris, and in the 1981 film Four Friends directed by Arthur Penn.

Tax protest
In 1968, Herlihy signed the "Writers and Editors War Tax Protest" pledge, vowing to refuse tax payments as a protest against the Vietnam War. He later also became a sponsor of the War Tax Resistance project, which practiced and advocated tax resistance as a form of protest against the war.

Bibliography

Novels
All Fall Down (1960)
Midnight Cowboy (1965)
The Season of the Witch (1971)

Plays
Streetlight Sonata (1950)
Moon in Capricorn (1953)
Blue Denim (1958)
Crazy October (1959)
Stop, You're Killing Me: Three Short Plays (1969)

Collections
The Sleep of Baby Filbertson and Other Stories (1958)
A Story That Ends with a Scream and Eight Others (1967)

References

External links

James Leo Herlihy papers held by Special Collections, University of Delaware
James Leo Herlihy letters to Edward P. Mitchell held by Special Collections, University of Delaware
Materials related to James Leo Herlihy in the Lyle Bonge - James Leo Herlihy correspondence collection held by Special Collections, University of Delaware
Materials related to James Leo Herlihy in the Jeffrey Bailey collection of James Leo Herlihy papers held by Special Collections, University of Delaware

1927 births
1993 suicides
20th-century American novelists
American male novelists
American tax resisters
Drug-related suicides in California
Writers from Detroit
American LGBT dramatists and playwrights
LGBT people from Michigan
American gay writers
American LGBT novelists
American male short story writers
20th-century American dramatists and playwrights
American male dramatists and playwrights
20th-century American short story writers
20th-century American male writers
Novelists from Michigan
Black Mountain College alumni
United States Navy personnel of World War II
1993 deaths
20th-century American LGBT people